İrem Helvacıoğlu (born 2 February 1990) is a Turkish actress. She is best known for her role in Sen Anlat Karadeniz as Nefes Kaleli.

Career 
Helvacıoğlu was born on 2 February 1990 in Germany. Her family is originally from Ankara. Her father is a colonel in Turkish army. During the Ottoman Empire, her grandfather is of Albanian descent who immigrated from Thessaloniki. She took acting lessons at Müjdat Gezen Art Center and had her first role on stage at the age of 11. In 2014, she had her first cinematic experience with a role in the movie 	Aşkın Dili. She made her television debut with a supporting role in the TV series Behzat Ç. Bir Ankara Polisiyesi. She was later cast in popular series such as Muhteşem Yüzyıl, Kurtlar Vadisi Pusu and Güneşin Kızları. Meanwhile, she continued her career in cinema with leading roles Organik Aşk Hikâyeleri, Babası and Kızım ve Ben. In 2016, she portrayed the character of Pelin Su in the series No 309. She had her first leading role on TV in the series Sen Anlat Karadeniz, for which she won a Golden Butterfly Award with Ulaş Tuna Astepe as the Best TV Couple. In 2020, she was cast as the leading character in the series Seni Çok Bekledim and portrayed the character of Ayliz. In 2021, Helvacıoğlu went on to star as a leading character alongside Seçkin Özdemir in the romantic comedy Baş Belası, where she played crime psychologist Dr. İpek Gümüşçü. In 2022, she shared the leading role in the Disney+ series Kaçış with Engin Akyürek.

Filmography

References

External links 
 
 

Living people
1990 births
Turkish film actresses
Turkish television actresses
Turkish people of Albanian descent
German film actresses
German television actresses
German people of Turkish descent
21st-century Turkish women artists